Auxolophotis cosmophilopis is a moth in the family Crambidae. It was described by Edward Meyrick in 1934. It is found on Fiji.

References

Moths described in 1934
Pyraustinae
Moths of Fiji
Taxa named by Edward Meyrick